The 1919 Lippe state election was held on 26 January 1919 to elect the 21 members of the Landtag of the Free State of Lippe.

Results

References 

Lippe
Elections in North Rhine-Westphalia